Rade Lončar (born December 6, 1996) is a Serbian professional basketball player. Standing at 6 ft 9 in (2.06 m), he plays at the power forward position.

Professional career

Lončar started his senior career in 2014 with Železničar Inđija.

He was in Vojvodina Srbijagas roster during the 2015–16 season.

References

External links
 Rade Lončar on eurobasket.com

 Rade Lončar on realgm.com 

1996 births
Living people
Basketball players from Belgrade
KK Železničar Inđija players
KK Vojvodina Srbijagas players
Serbian men's basketball players
Power forwards (basketball)